David Fellenger (born 6 June 1969) is a Scottish former footballer, who played as a midfielder for Hibernian and Cowdenbeath.

References

1969 births
Living people
Footballers from Edinburgh
Scottish footballers
Association football midfielders
Hibernian F.C. players
Cowdenbeath F.C. players
Scottish Football League players
Lothian Thistle Hutchison Vale F.C. players